Luca Berardi (born May 24, 2003) is a Kenyan-Italian child television host and musician.

Berardi co-hosted a children's programme, Big Minds, which aired on KBC from July 2014 to July 2016.

He has recorded and released three songs, including the single A Better Place. He performed another song he worte, Money Can, at the Children and Youth Finance conference held at the Headquarters of the United Nations in 2014.

He is the founder and CEO of Young Animal Rescue Heroes (YARH), an organisation whose self-declared aim is to "create awareness for endangered wildlife and environmental conservation". He has visited schools and given speeches on conservation. Berardi was awarded the Young Environmental Hero of the Year award by the WWF in 2018 for his work with YARH.

References

2003 births
Living people